The Canon EF-M 18-150mm f/3.5-6.3 IS STM is an interchangeable telezoom lens for the Canon EOS M system of mirrorless cameras. It was announced by Canon on September 15, 2016, together with the EOS M5.

References

External links
https://www.usa.canon.com/internet/portal/us/home/products/list/lenses/ef/ef-m/ef-m
https://www.dpreview.com/news/4947039818/canon-announces-ef-m-18-150mm-f3-5-6-3-stm-and-ef-70-300-f4-5-5-6-is-ii-usm-lenses
https://www.the-digital-picture.com/Reviews/Canon-EF-M-18-150mm-f-3.5-6.3-IS-STM-Lens.aspx

Canon EF-M-mount lenses
Camera lenses introduced in 2016